Calpain-2 catalytic subunit is a protein that in humans is encoded by the CAPN2 gene.

Function 

The calpains, calcium-activated neutral proteases, are nonlysosomal, intracellular cysteine proteases. The mammalian calpains include ubiquitous, stomach-specific, and muscle-specific proteins. The ubiquitous enzymes consist of heterodimers with distinct large, catalytic subunits associated with a common small, regulatory subunit. This gene encodes the large subunit of the ubiquitous enzyme, calpain 2. Multiple heterogeneous transcriptional start sites in the 5' UTR have been reported.

Interactions 

CAPN2 has been shown to interact with Bcl-2.

References

Further reading

External links 
 The MEROPS online database for peptidases and their inhibitors: C02.002
 

EF-hand-containing proteins